The Nexus Player was a digital media player co-developed by Google, Intel and Asus. It was the second media player in the Google Nexus family of consumer devices. Originally running the Android 5.0 ("Lollipop") operating system, it was the first device to employ the Android TV platform. The Nexus player supports Google Cast, the feature for selecting and controlling media playback on a television that was first introduced by Chromecast. Sales of the Nexus Player were discontinued in May 2016, and product support ended in March 2018.

History 
The Nexus Player was unveiled on October 15, 2014, and made available for pre-order two days later on the Google Play Store for $99, and later made available for purchase at retail stores in the US.

On May 24, 2016, Google discontinued direct sales of the Nexus Player. In May 2017, Google announced that Google Assistant was coming to the Nexus Player later in the year.  In November 2017, the device was updated with the Google Assistant feature through the monthly security update. In March 2018, Google confirmed that the Nexus Player would not receive Android 9 Pie and that security updates had also ended for the device.

In August 2018, Android Headlines reported that some Nexus Player were facing an issue where they became inoperable.

Hardware 
It is powered by a 1.8 GHz quad-core Intel Atom Z3560 processor with 1 GB of LPDDR3 RAM and 8 GB of internal eMMC storage.

Remote control 
The Nexus Player comes bundled with a Bluetooth remote control, with a direction pad & middle enter button, a back, home and play/pause button. It also features a button to activate the Google Search application to search for content by speaking through the remote's built-in microphone. The device can also be controlled by any Android smartphone with Google Play services. The app also features a Wear OS counterpart to allow remote input from compatible smartwatches.

Features
The Nexus Player and Android TV allows consumers to use an HDTV set to play music, watch video originating from Internet services or a local network, and play games (Emulators and Android Games). The primary interface is interacted with using a remote with a D-pad dial and 5 buttons. The remote also includes a microphone for voice search functions within supported apps and the main system interface. Android TV can be paired with Bluetooth gaming controllers to interact with the system interface / applications, as well as, playing games. Android TV also includes all features and streaming capabilities of the Chromecast device.

 Users can access the Google Play store directly through the user interface to rent / buy movies, TV shows and stream play music. 
 Live Channels by Google allows users to stream from media sources including the HDHomeRun TV tuner with TV Guide functionality
 Kodi allows users to access a host of applications and content available through Kodi (formerly XBMC)
 Netflix
 Hulu Plus 
 YouTube
 TED
 HDHomeRun App
 VLC media player
 FX Now
 Sling TV
 Disney Movies Anywhere
 Crackle
 Epix
 Plex
 HGTV Watch 
 PBS Kids Video
 CNET
 CBS News
 Bloomberg TV+
 HuffPost Live for Android TV
 TuneIn Radio
 iHeartRadio
 Songza TV
 CBS Sports
 Red Bull TV
 MLB.TV
 Vevo
 Showtime
 Vimeo
 Vudu

FCC difficulties 
During its initial days on sale, the Nexus Player was pulled from the Google Play Store because it had not passed FCC certification.  Two days later, the device returned to the Play Store after receiving said certification.

See also
Nexus Q
Chromebit
Apple TV, a similar product from Apple Inc.
Roku, a similar product from Roku, Inc.
Amazon Fire TV, a similar product from Amazon

References

External links 
 Asus website

Google Nexus
Microconsoles
Digital media players
Android (operating system) devices
Streaming media systems
Smart TV
Asus products
Set-top box